Christopher Ferdinand Durang (born January 2, 1949) is an American playwright known for works of outrageous and often absurd comedy. His work was especially popular in the 1980s, though his career seemed to get a second wind in the late 1990s.

Sister Mary Ignatius Explains It All For You was Durang's watershed play as it brought him to national prominence when it won him—at the age of 32—the Obie Award for Best Playwright (1980). His play, Vanya and Sonia and Masha and Spike won the Tony Award for Best Play in 2013. The production was directed by Nicholas Martin, and featured Sigourney Weaver, David Hyde Pierce, Kristine Nielsen, Billy Magnussen, Shalita Grant and Genevieve Angelson. Durang is a former co-director of the Lila Acheson Wallace American Playwrights Program at Juilliard.

Early life and education
Durang was born in Montclair, New Jersey, the son of two WWII veterans, architect Francis Ferdinand Durang Jr. and Patricia Elizabeth Durang (née Mansfield), a secretary. He grew up in Berkeley Heights, New Jersey. He attended Catholic schools: Our Lady of Peace School (New Providence) and Delbarton (Morristown). He received a B.A. in English from Harvard College and an M.F.A. in playwriting from Yale School of Drama.

Work

His work often deals critically with issues of child abuse, Roman Catholic dogma, culture, and homosexuality. Ben Brantley summarized key themes from Durang's plays in a review written in 1994: 1) narcissism; 2) fear or engagement with a danger-filled world; 3) the strangulating nature of family ties; 4) sexual disorientation and the tenuousness of individual identity; to this list the abusive power of authority figures could be added. While Durang's use of parody and his criticism of many social institutions might appear overly cynical at times, he states: ... when I say everyone is crazy that means it's a very bad day where the amount of crazy people in the world has spread out to the entire universe and it doesn't seem possible to cope with anything... I think we're all neurotic. And I do think relationships are certainly difficult. Nonetheless, those lines in the play do get a laugh, so there's something. It's not as despairing as it sounds, but I don't not believe it.

Much of Durang's style can be attributed to the aesthetic of black comedy, a humor style that offers a fatalistic view of life. Durang discusses the particular frame of mind that requires the viewer to distance himself from the horrific episode of human suffering and pain; he explains:I exaggerate awful things further, and then I present it in a way that is funny, and for those of us who find it funny, it has to do with a very clear suspension of disbelief. It is a play, after all, with acted characters; it allows us a distance we couldn’t have in reality.  To me this distance allows me to find some rather serious topics funny.Durang suggests that his form of humor requires a double-consciousness, an ability to register scenes of cruelty or pain, while simultaneously comprehending the humor.  He credits Arthur Kopit's “tragicfarce” Oh Dad, Poor Dad, Mamma's Hung You in the Closet and I'm Feelin' So Sad as an early influence on his creative vision, a black comedy in which a woman totes her dead husband's corpse on vacation with her.  Humor is one way of resolving conflict and anxiety, and black comedy goes a step further to relieve tension regarding subjects that are typically difficult to think about, such as death, family dysfunction, or torture.

His plays have been performed nationwide, including on Broadway and Off-Broadway. His works include those in the bibliography as well as a collection of one-act parodies meant to be performed in one evening entitled Durang/Durang that includes "Mrs. Sorken", "For Whom The Southern Belle Tolls" (a parody of The Glass Menagerie by Tennessee Williams), "A Stye of the Eye", "Nina in the Morning", "Wanda's Visit", and "Business Lunch at the Russian Tea Room".

Together with Marsha Norman, Durang directed The Lila Acheson Wallace American Playwrights Program at the Juilliard School from 1984 to 2016, teaching playwrights Joshua Harmon and Noah Haidle, as well as Pulitzer-Prize winning David Lindsay-Abaire, who succeeded Durang as co-director.

Durang has performed as an actor for both stage and screen. He first came to prominence in his Off-Broadway satirical review Das Lusitania Songspiel, which he performed with friend and fellow Yale alum Sigourney Weaver. Later he co-starred in one of his own plays as Matt in The Marriage of Bette and Boo, as well as Man in the original production of Laughing Wild.

In film
Durang has denounced the Robert Altman 1987 film adaptation of Beyond Therapy, calling it "horrific". He accused Altman of totally rewriting the script "so that all psychology is thrown out the window, and the characters dash around acting crazy but with literally no behavioral logic underneath."

Durang has appeared as an actor in the 1987 comedy The Secret of My Success, 1988's Mr. North, 1989's Penn & Teller Get Killed, 1990's In the Spirit, 1992's HouseSitter and 1994's The Cowboy Way.

He has written a number of unproduced screenplays, including The Nun Who Shot Liberty Valance, The House of Husbands (which he co-authored with Wendy Wasserstein), and The Adventures of Lola.

On television
Wanda's Visit, one of the six one-acts in Durang/Durang was originally written for the PBS series Trying Times. Durang played the part of The Waiter in that production.

Durang appeared as himself on the October 11, 1986 episode of Saturday Night Live, hosted by his longtime friend Sigourney Weaver. In the episode, Durang and Weaver parodied the works of Bertolt Brecht, and both were interviewed in the debut of the recurring sketch Church Chat, with Durang as himself.

The sketch "Funeral Parlor" (1987), written for a televised Carol Burnett special, features a grieving widow (Burnett) who is disturbed at her husband's wake by an eccentric mourner, played by Robin Williams.

Personal life
Durang lives in Bucks County, Pennsylvania, with his husband, actor/playwright John Augustine. They have been together since 1986 and were legally married in 2014.

In 2016, Durang was diagnosed with logopenic progressive aphasia, which is thought to be caused by a form of Alzheimer's disease; as with all forms of aphasia, it primarily impedes his ability to process language, though it has subsequently affected his short-term memory. Durang gradually withdrew from public life before his condition was publicly announced in 2022.

Bibliography

Musicals
 1978: A History of the American Film
 1979: Das Lusitania Songspiel
 2002: Mrs. Bob Cratchit's Wild Christmas Binge
 2007: Adrift in Macao

Awards and honors
He received Obie Awards for Sister Mary Ignatius, The Marriage of Bette and Boo and Betty's Summer Vacation. He received a nomination for a Tony Award for Best Book of a Musical for A History of the American Film, and he won a Tony Award for Best Play in 2013 for his play Vanya and Sonia and Masha and Spike.

Durang has been awarded numerous fellowships and high-profile grants including a Guggenheim, a Rockefeller, the CBS Playwriting Fellowship, the Lecomte du Nouy Foundation grant, and the Kenyon Festival Theatre Playwriting Prize.

He is a member of the Dramatists Guild Council. He was also a finalist for the Pulitzer Prize in Drama in 2006 for Miss Witherspoon.

On May 17, 2010 he was presented with the very first Luminary Award from the New York Innovative Theatre Awards for his work Off-Off-Broadway.

He was awarded the PEN/Laura Pels International Foundation for Theater Award in 2012. That same year, he was inducted into the American Theater Hall of Fame.

References

External links

BOMB Magazine interview with Christopher Durang by Craig Gholson

 (archive)

1949 births
Living people
20th-century American dramatists and playwrights
20th-century American male writers
20th-century LGBT people
21st-century American dramatists and playwrights
21st-century American male writers
21st-century LGBT people
American gay writers
American male dramatists and playwrights
American male screenwriters
Delbarton School alumni
Educators from New Jersey
Former Roman Catholics
Harvard College alumni
Juilliard School faculty
American LGBT dramatists and playwrights
LGBT people from New Jersey
American LGBT screenwriters
Obie Award recipients
People from Berkeley Heights, New Jersey
People from Bucks County, Pennsylvania
People from Montclair, New Jersey
People with Alzheimer's disease
Screenwriters from New Jersey
Yale School of Drama alumni